John Mohr may refer to:
 John W. Mohr (1956–2019), American sociologist
 John P. Mohr (1910–1997), administrator with the US Federal Bureau of Investigation